Kingdom Come is a four-issue comic book miniseries published in 1996 by DC Comics under their Elseworlds imprint. It was written by Mark Waid and Alex Ross and painted in gouache by Ross, who also developed the concept from an original idea. 

The story is set in an alternate future of the DC Universe. The new generation of heroes have lost their moral compass, becoming as reckless and violent as the villains they fight. The previous regime of heroes—the Justice League—returns under dire circumstances, which sets up a battle of the old guard against these uncompromising protectors in a conflict that will define what heroism truly is and determine the future of the planet.

Development
When comic book artist Alex Ross was working on Marvels, published in 1994, he decided to create a similar "grand opus" about characters from DC Comics. Ross wrote a 40-page handwritten outline of what would become Kingdom Come and pitched the idea to James Robinson as a project similar in scope to Watchmen (1986–1987) and Alan Moore's infamous "lost work" Twilight of the Superheroes. Ultimately, Ross teamed with writer Mark Waid, who was recommended by DC editors due to his strong familiarity with the history of DC superheroes.

Plot
In this Elseworlds story, Superman and the Justice League abandon their roles as superheroes after the rise and strong public support of a superhero named Magog, who has no qualms about killing—notably the Joker, on his way to trial for the mass murder of the Daily Planet staff, including Lois Lane. In the ensuing years, a newer generation of superpowered metahumans arise. They engage in destructive battles with little distinction between "heroes" and "villains." The narrator, minister Norman McCay, receives apocalyptic visions of the future from a dying Wesley Dodds. The Spectre appears to McCay and recruits him to help pass judgment on the approaching superhuman apocalypse.
   
An attack on the Parasite, led by Magog, goes awry when Parasite tears open Captain Atom. As a result, much of the American Midwest is irradiated, killing millions and destroying a large portion of the United States's food production. Coaxed back into action by Wonder Woman, Superman returns to Metropolis and re-forms the Justice League.

He recruits new and old heroes. The most prominent exception is the Batman, who resents Superman for leaving the world 10 years ago. Batman warns him that his idealist notions are outdated and his violent interference will only exacerbate the world's problems. In response to Superman's Justice League, Batman activates his own network of agents, the "Outsiders", made up largely of younger second and third-generation heroes. Trusted veterans, such as Green Arrow, Black Canary and Blue Beetle, are chosen as lieutenants. Lex Luthor organizes the "Mankind Liberation Front". The MLF is secretly a group of Golden Age villains and third-generation villains like Ra's al Ghul's successor, Ibn al Xu'ffasch, who is Bruce Wayne and Talia al Ghul's son. The MLF works to take control of the world from the heroes.

Superman's Justice League gathers more captives than converts, and his prison (nicknamed "the Gulag") is quickly filled to capacity. Superman works to persuade the inmates that their methods are wrong-headed and dangerous, to no avail. With hostile heroes and villains locked up together, pressure builds. Meanwhile, Superman learns that Wonder Woman's ardent militant stance may be influenced by her recent exile from Paradise Island: In the eyes of the Amazons, her mission to bring peace to the outside world has failed, and she has thus been stripped of her royalty. Batman and his Outsiders seem to ally themselves with MLF against the Justice League. Luthor's plan is to exacerbate the conflict between the League and Gulag's inmates. Batman quickly discovers that an adult Billy Batson is under Luthor's control. Batson, as Captain Marvel, is the only metahuman capable of matching Superman's power. When the inmates riot and kill Captain Comet, Luthor unwittingly reveals to Batman he intends to use the brainwashed Batson to break open the Gulag. Batman's forces ambush Luthor and his conspirators, but are unable to restrain Batson, who transforms into Marvel and flies off. While Wonder Woman leads the Justice League to the prison riot, Superman confronts Batman. Batman tries to justify inaction, saying the world would be better off if all the metahumans destroyed each other. However, Superman knows that Batman will act, because his entire crimefighting life is based upon the desire to prevent the loss of human life.

Moved by Superman's sentiments, Batman tells him that Captain Marvel is under Luthor's control and is on the way to the Gulag. Superman races to the prison, but upon arrival is struck down by Captain Marvel. The Gulag is breached, freeing the population, and inciting war between them and the Justice League. Batman's army arrives on site as an intervening third party, but is unable to stop Wonder Woman from killing the supervillain Von Bach, which increases the fury of the riot.

As conditions worsen, United Nations Secretary General Wyrmwood authorizes the deployment of three tactical nuclear warheads, hardened against metahumans. In the middle of their fight, Batman and Wonder Woman see the incoming bombers piloted by the Blackhawk Squadron. They break off fighting and manage to stop two bombs, but miss the third. Captain Marvel uses his lightning bolt as a weapon against Superman, who manages to grab Marvel and allow the bolt to transform him into Billy. Holding Batson's mouth shut, Superman tells him he is going to stop the remaining bomb. Batson must make a choice: either stop Superman and allow the warhead to kill all the metahumans, or let Superman stop the bomb and allow the metahumans' war to engulf the world. Superman tells Batson he must be the one to decide, as he is the only one who lives in both worlds: a man (as Batson) and a god (as Marvel). Batson, his mind now clear of Luthor's influence, turns back into Captain Marvel. He flings Superman to the ground and flies after the missile. Marvel intercepts the missile and shouts "Shazam!" three times in rapid succession, detonating the bomb prematurely, and killing Batson in the process.

Despite Marvel's sacrifice, most of the metahumans are obliterated in the explosion. Superman is unharmed, but does not realize that there are any other survivors. Enraged at the tremendous loss of life, he flies to the U.N. Building and threatens to kill the delegates as punishment for the massacre. The surviving metahumans arrive, but McCay is the one who talks him down, pointing out how his appearance and behavior are exactly the sort of reasons that normal humans fear the superpowered. Superman immediately ceases his rampage. He is handed Captain Marvel's cape, and tells the U.N. that he will use his wisdom to guide, rather than lead, humankind. Superman ties Captain Marvel's cape to a flagpole and raises it among the flags of the member nations of the U.N., suggesting that this role of guidance will be more political and global in nature than the classic crime-busting vigilantism of the past. In the epilogue, the heroes strive to become fully integrated members of the communities. Wonder Woman's exile from Paradise Island ends. She becomes an ambassador for super-humanity, taking the survivors of the Gulag to Paradise Island for rehabilitation. Batman abandons his crusade and becomes a healer, rebuilding his mansion as a hospital to care for those wounded by the destruction of the Gulag. He reconciles with both Dick Grayson/Red Robin and his son, Ibn al Xu'ffasch. Superman begins the task of restoring the Midwestern farmlands devastated after Magog's attack. He comes to terms with his past as Clark Kent by accepting a pair of glasses from Wonder Woman, and shares a kiss with her before she returns to Paradise Island. Norman McCay resumes pastorship of his congregation, preaching a message of hope for humanity. Among the congregation is Jim Corrigan, the Spectre's human host.

Collected edition additional scenes
The first additional scene (four pages) takes place near the end of the second part of the series. Superman visits Orion on Apokolips, which has changed very little despite Darkseid no longer being in power. He asks Orion for his advice on what to do with the captive rogue metahumans. Orion, who has grown to resemble his father and has adopted a rather jaded view on life, initially offers to accept Superman's charges as exiles to Apokolips. Superman rejects that solution, claiming he can learn nothing from Orion, and goes back to Earth.

The second additional scene is an eight-page epilogue. Clark Kent and Diana Prince meet with Bruce Wayne at 'Planet Krypton,' a theme restaurant owned by Michael Jon Carter. They plan to tell Bruce they are expecting a child, but he deduces the news first. Diana asks Bruce to serve as godfather. He emotionally accepts after Clark tells Bruce he will provide a balancing influence to the child, adding that in spite of their differences over the years, he has always trusted Batman. As they leave the restaurant, Bruce notices Norman and Jim Corrigan discussing the restaurant's "Spectre Platter", much to Corrigan's irritation that this is how he is being remembered.

Characters

Appearances in mainstream continuity

The Kingdom

Due to the popularity of the series, Mark Waid and Alex Ross began to plot a sequel/prequel titled The Kingdom. Alex Ross's original intent was for Gog to be an alien, twice the size of a human, from the planet Urgrund that split into two and created Apokolips and New Genesis, and that Magog would be the grown son of Superman and Wonder Woman, who would be mentored by Gog. Waid and Ross disagreed on several concepts and Ross decided to leave the project.

Without Ross's involvement, Waid continued the story in the New Year's Evil: Gog one-shot. The Kingdom miniseries soon followed, featuring a two-part series and several one-shots focusing on specific characters. The series was used to present Grant Morrison's Hypertime concept.

Thy Kingdom Come
The final issue of 52 reveals that Earth 22 is the designation of the Kingdom Come alternate universe.

In Justice Society of America (vol. 3), a new Starman appears wearing a costume identical to that of the Starman from the Kingdom Come series. It is soon revealed that this individual is indeed the Starman from Kingdom Come, and that he is also Thom Kallor, a native of the planet Xanthu and member of the Legion of Super-Heroes in the 30th and 31st centuries. Due to a time-travel error, Starman traveled to Earth 22 before arriving in 21st-century New Earth.

The "Thy Kingdom Come" story arc of the Justice Society of America title features the involvement of Alex Ross, as well as the appearance of the Kingdom Come Superman. Seeing the connection between Gog of New Earth and Magog of Earth 22, Superman 22 and the JSA seek to prevent New Earth from going the way of his own world by stopping Gog in his crusade to rid the world of false gods, and before he can choose a successor one day in Magog. The JSA is split in their opinions on Gog; some believe he is truly benevolent, while others are suspicious of his true intentions. To prove himself, Gog heals certain JSA members such as Starman, Doctor Mid-Nite, and Damage, and he resurrects Lance from the dead to make him his successor, Magog.

Soon, the JSA learns that Gog is forming a parasitic relationship with the planet Earth. If he remains long enough, the planet will not be able to survive without him. The JSA remove Gog's head, and Superman 22 and Starman take it to the Source Wall. Starman sends Superman back to Earth 22 in time to see the carnage caused by Captain Marvel detonating the bomb. The events of Kingdom Come continue from there and conclude in its entirety, with additional scenes depicting Superman's life and legacy for the next 1,000 years.

Alex Ross states that this story is not intended as a sequel to Kingdom Come, as that would negate the purpose of the original story.

Justice League: Generation Lost

A major subplot of Judd Winick and Keith Giffen's 2010 maxiseries, Justice League: Generation Lost concerns the events of Kingdom Come. The story sees Maxwell Lord being tasked by the Entity with killing Magog before he can inadvertently trigger an apocalyptic war between Earth's superhumans, which ultimately brings Magog and Lord into conflict with Justice League International. To drive the point home, the Entity shows Lord a series of visions taken directly from Kingdom Come, including Magog and the Justice Battalion attacking Parasite. Lord eventually succeeds in arranging Magog's demise, and his life is returned by the Entity.

Superman/Batman

During the first arc of the Superman/Batman series written by Jeph Loeb, what appears to be the Kingdom Come Superman appears via a Boom Tube in the Batcave with the intent to kill Clark Kent, because according to him, Clark is responsible for the destruction of the Earth. Kingdom Come Superman suddenly vanishes while being distracted by his past self calling him "Clark". It is eventually revealed that this Superman came from a future in which a kryptonite meteorite crashed to the Earth.

Later, due to a burst of quantum energy, Captain Atom arrives in this future. He appears in a devastated Kansas (an homage to the Kingdom Come series) although Superman states the entire planet is in the same condition. With advice from this future Superman, Captain Atom returns to the present and uses a robot made by Toyman to destroy the giant meteorite of kryptonite, preventing this future from coming true.

In a follow-up to this story, Captain Atom: Armageddon, the titular Captain Atom finds himself in the WildStorm universe and in another homage to Kingdom Come, his appearance mysteriously changes to that of his Earth-22 counterpart.

Collected editions

A boxed-set of the four individual issues was packaged in a die-cut cardboard sleeve with a Skybox trading card, part of a short-lived experimental program to package comics for resale at Toys "R" Us and other mass-market retailers.

The original trade paperback from 1997 collected the entire series along with twelve additional pages by Ross, including the epilogue. Promotional artwork and sketches of the major characters were also included. The trade was also printed as a hardback (without dustjacket) by Graphitti Designs. A new trade paperback was released in 2008, which Alex Ross provided a new cover painting for this new edition, which featured a deluxe foldout cover only on its first printing (subsequent printings will not include the foldout afterward).

A separate deluxe, slip-cased two-volume hardback edition, also co-published by DC and Graphitti Designs added a second volume (entitled Revelations) to the text, containing further sketches and developmental artwork from Ross, showing the development of the character designs and the storyline.

A 1998 special from Wizard magazine contained the original proposal for the series by Ross, providing notes on what was changed and why. Ross's comments on The Kingdom were also included.

DC released an Absolute Kingdom Come hardcover edition in 2006. It collected the entire series in a significantly larger page format, along with interviews with Waid and Ross, character artwork, sketches and a complete annotation for the series. In the second quarter of 2018 it was released.

The novelization was written by Elliot S. Maggin. It was published by Warner Aspect as a hardback, and (in limited numbers) a slip-cased, signed edition. It fleshes out characters such as Magog, the world leaders, and the Batman/Ib'n connection. The book contains four new color pages by Ross, as well as four black and white sketches of the major players.

In other media

DC Animated Universe

 In the DC Animated Universe series Justice League Unlimited episode "Clash", there are several subtle and not-so-subtle tributes to the classic clashes of Superman and Captain Marvel in comics form, most notably in Kingdom Come. In both accounts, Captain Marvel uses his magic lightning to attack Superman, while Superman manages to make one of the bolts strike Marvel and proceeds to gag Billy.

Arrowverse 
In July 2019, it was revealed that Brandon Routh would be reprising his role of Clark Kent / Superman from the 2006 film Superman Returns in the 2019–2020 Arrowverse crossover event "Crisis on Infinite Earths". This version of Superman takes inspiration from Kingdom Come. He wears a similar suit and works at the Daily Planet, which was attacked, presumably by the Joker. His Earth was designated as Earth-96, a reference to the year the comic was released. Furthermore, Kevin Conroy portrayed a variation of Bruce Wayne from Earth-99 that also incorporated elements of the Kingdom Come version, such as the character wearing an exo-suit.

DC Extended Universe 
In Wonder Woman 1984, Wonder Woman is seen wearing her Kingdom Come armor.
Hiram Garcia told Collider that he would love to create a Kingdom Come movie as a dream project.
In November 2022, DC Studios CEO James Gunn tweeted an image from the miniseries. Seemingly teasing Kingdom Come as an upcoming project within the DCEU.

Spin-offs

Audio play

Hachette Audio released an audio dramatization of the story, adapted from the novelization, featuring the voice talent of Mike Mearian, Don Peoples, Garet Scott, John Cunningham, Kent Broadhurst, Jeff David, Chuck Cooper, Harry Goz, Barbara Rosenblat, Craig Zakarian, Mike Arkin, Bob Lydiard, Peter Newman, Birgit Darby, Mark Finley, Igot Goldin, Macintyre Dixon, and Chloe Patellis, along with the guest voices of Dennis O'Neil, Mark Waid, Mike Carlin, Dan Raspler, Charles Kochman, Peter Tomasi, Greg Ross, Janet Harvey, Elisabeth Vincentelli. The music for the audio version was composed by John Bauers.

The Comicology Kingdom Come Companion
In January 1999, Harbor Press published the first (special) issue of their comics magazine Comicology. The 272-page Comicology: Kingdom Come Companion, edited by Brian Lamken, focused heavily on Kingdom Come, featuring an A-Z of almost everything, with extensive illustrations by Ross and various other commentary on the miniseries. It was the subject of a swift cease-and-desist notice from DC, objecting that the volume "constitute[d] an unauthorized derivative work that infringe[d] upon [DC's] copyrights, violates [their] trademark rights, and misappropriates [their] good will." Lamken acquiesced to the recall, despite protesting that DC had prior knowledge of the project. It is likely that the similarities between the material contained in the Revelations volume (available only with the purchase of the considerably-more-expensive Graphitti/DC two-volume set) contributed to the recall of the Comicology volume. The recall made the Companion arguably the most difficult Kingdom Come item to find.

Trading cards

In 1996, Fleer/Skybox released a set of trading cards based on Kingdom Come, entitled Kingdom Come eXtra. Alongside the 50 basic cards, featuring art by Ross and text by Waid, there are 15 "sketchboard" cards, three "Kingdom Classics" (featuring Superman, Batman and Wonder Woman in iconic poses), six "Alex Ross Original" cards, and some rarer autograph cards.

Action figures

DC Direct (the exclusive collectibles division of DC Comics) has produced three waves of action figures based on Kingdom Comes artwork. The first wave of figures included Superman, Wonder Woman, Green Lantern and Hawkman. The second wave included Batman, Red Robin, Captain Marvel and Kid Flash. The last wave included Magog, Flash, Armored Wonder Woman and Deadman. An exclusive figure of Red Arrow was released through ToyFare magazine. DC Direct also released several other characters through their Elseworlds toylines. These figures included the Spectre, Norman McCay, Jade, Nightstar, Aquaman and Blue Beetle. An updated version of Kingdom Come Superman was released in JSA series2, which was based on the covers that Alex Ross worked on.

An action figure of Superman based on Kingdom Come's artwork was released as part of Wave 10 of Mattel's DC Multiverse toyline.

See also
 Earth X, another alternate universe series written and illustrated by Alex Ross with some of the similar themes and artwork shared with Kingdom Come.
 Injustice: Gods Among Us, a series of video games and comic books that have a story similar to Kingdom Come such as the Joker killing Lois Lane in Metropolis or Superman and Batman forming their own factions of superheroes and fighting each other.

References

1996 comics debuts
Apocalyptic comics
DC Comics limited series
Eisner Award winners for Best Limited Series
Comics by Mark Waid
Nightmares in fiction
Fiction books about precognition